Verena Lisa Wieder (born 26 June 2000) is a German footballer who plays as a midfielder for Bayer Leverkusen. She was youth international for Germany on several selection levels.

Honours

Club
German football championship of B-juniors 2017 with the FC Bayern Munich U17

International
UEFA Women's Under-19 Championship: Winner 2016
UEFA Women's Under-19 Championship: Winner 2017

References

External links
 Verena Wieder auf soccerdonna.de
 Verena-Wieder auf fupa.net

2000 births
Living people
German women's footballers
FC Bayern Munich (women) players
SC Freiburg (women) players
Women's association football midfielders
Frauen-Bundesliga players
Bayer 04 Leverkusen (women) players